Netherlandish Proverbs (also called Flemish Proverbs, The Blue Cloak or The Topsy Turvy World) is a 1559 oil-on-oak-panel painting by Pieter Bruegel the Elder that depicts a scene in which humans and, to a lesser extent, animals and objects, offer literal illustrations of Dutch-language proverbs and idioms.

Running themes in Bruegel's paintings that appear in Netherlandish Proverbs are the absurdity, wickedness and foolishness of humans. Its original title, The Blue Cloak or The Folly of the World, indicates that Bruegel's intent was not just to illustrate proverbs, but rather to catalogue human folly. Many of the people depicted show the characteristic blank features that Bruegel used to portray fools.

His son, Pieter Brueghel the Younger, specialised in making copies of his father's work and painted at least 16 copies of Netherlandish Proverbs. Not all versions of the painting, by father or son, show exactly the same proverbs and they also differ in other minor details.

History

Context
Proverbs were very popular in Bruegel's time and before; a hundred years before Bruegel's painting, illustrations of proverbs had been popular in the Flemish books of hours. A number of collections were published, including Adagia, by the Dutch humanist Desiderius Erasmus. The French writer François Rabelais employed significant numbers in his novel Gargantua and Pantagruel, completed in 1564.

The Flemish artist Frans Hogenberg made an engraving illustrating 43 proverbs in around 1558, roughly the same time as Bruegel's painting. The work is very similar in composition to Bruegel's and includes certain proverbs (like the Blue Cloak) which also feature prominently in Netherlandish Proverbs. By depicting literal renditions of proverbs in a peasant setting, both artists have shown a "world turned upside down".

Bruegel himself had painted several minor paintings on the subject of proverbs including Big Fish Eat Little Fish (1556) and Twelve Proverbs (1558), but Netherlandish Proverbs is thought to have been his first large-scale painting on the theme.

The painting
The painting, dated 1559, is considered the best of a series of similar paintings which at one time or other have all previously been attributed to Pieter Bruegel the Elder, has been x-rayed for its underdrawing to compare it to other versions. None of the versions have a provenance going back further than the late 19th-century, but Brueghel scholars believe that the paintings are the elder Bruegel's inventions, which all make use of a life-size cartoon with the same underdrawing as that used in the Berlin version. The paintings, which are not inscribed, tease the viewer into guessing proverbs. They are based on 1558 and earlier engravings that are inscribed, in Flemish. The most notable of these regarding the paintings is by Frans Hogenberg, and it is dated 1558 and accompanied by the title Die blau huicke is dit meest ghenaemt, maer des weerelts abvisen he beter betaempt (English: Often called 'The Blue Cloak', this could better be called 'The World's Follies'). The Doetecum brothers produced a print series in 1577 called De Blauwe Huyck. Theodoor Galle also made a print, dated later, with a similar title: Dese wtbeeldinghe wort die blauw hvyck genaemt, maer deze werelts abvysen haer beter betaemt.

Proverbs and idioms
Critics have praised the composition for its ordered portrayal and integrated scene. There are approximately 126 identifiable proverbs and idioms in the scene, although Bruegel may have included others which cannot be determined because of the language change. Some of those incorporated in the painting are still in popular use, for instance "Swimming against the tide", "Banging one's head against a brick wall" and "Armed to the teeth". Many more have faded from use, which makes analysis of the painting harder. "Having one's roof tiled with tarts", for example, which meant to have an abundance of everything and was an image Bruegel would later feature in his painting of the idyllic Land of Cockaigne (1567).

The Blue Cloak, the piece's original title, features in the centre of the piece and is being placed on a man by his wife, indicating that she is cuckolding him. Other proverbs indicate human foolishness. A man fills in a pond after his calf has died. Just above the central figure of the blue-cloaked man, another man carries daylight in a basket. Some of the figures seem to represent more than one figure of speech (whether this was Bruegel's intention or not is unknown), such as the man shearing a sheep in the centre bottom left of the picture. He is sitting next to a man shearing a pig, so represents the expression "One shears sheep and one shears pigs", meaning that one has the advantage over the other, but may also represent the advice "Shear them but don't skin them", meaning make the most of available assets.

List of proverbs and idioms featured in the painting

Inspiration for other paintings
T. E. Breitenbach's 1975 painting Proverbidioms was inspired by this Dutch painting to depict English proverbs and idioms.

A 2014 illustration from the Hong Kong magazine Passion Times illustrates dozens of Cantonese proverbs.

In popular culture 
The painting is featured on the album cover of Fleet Foxes self-titled first full-length album (2008).

Gallery

Notes

Footnotes

References

 not found 6 Nov. 2022

Dundes, Alan and Claudia A. Stibbe (1981). The Art of Mixing Metaphors: A Folkloristic Interpretation of the Netherlandish Proverbs by Pieter Bruegel the Elder. Helsinki: Suomalainen Tiedeakatemia Academia Scientiarum Fennica. .

Further reading

External links

Bruegel's The Dutch Proverbs, Smarthistory video, commentary by Beth Harris and Steven Zucker
The Netherlandish Proverbs, Zoomable and Annotated
Interactive mobile/responsive version of The Netherlandish Proverbs

Paintings by Pieter Bruegel the Elder
1559 paintings
Paintings in the Gemäldegalerie, Berlin
Proverbs
Dogs in art